Oedaspis dichotoma is a species of tephritid or fruit flies in the genus Oedaspis of the family Tephritidae.

Distribution
Russia, Kazakhstan, Mongolia.

References

Tephritinae
Insects described in 1869
Diptera of Asia